Boldin is a surname. Notable people with the surname include:

Anquan Boldin (born 1980), American football player
DJ Boldin (born 1986), American football coach and former player
Igor Boldin (born 1964), Russian ice hockey player
Ivan Boldin (1892-1965), Soviet army-officer in World War II
Valery Boldin (1935—2006), Soviet politician

See also
Bodin (surname)
Bolden (name), given name and surname